Thiomonas perometabolis is a bacterium in the genus Thiomonas.

References

External links
Type strain of Thiomonas perometabolis at BacDive -  the Bacterial Diversity Metadatabase

Comamonadaceae
Bacteria described in 1997